Achaea intercisa is a species of moth of the family Erebidae first described by Francis Walker in 1865. It is found in Sierra Leone.

References

Achaea (moth)
Erebid moths of Africa
Lepidoptera of West Africa
Moths described in 1865